PB-20 Khuzdar-III is a constituency of the Provincial Assembly of Balochistan.

General elections 2013

General elections 2008

See also
 PB-19 Khuzdar-II
 PB-21 Hub

References

External links
 Election commission Pakistan's official website
 Awazoday.com check result
 Balochistan's Assembly official site

Constituencies of Balochistan